Endotricha ignealis is a moth of the family Pyralidae. It was described by Achille Guenée in 1854 and is found in Australia.

References

Moths described in 1854
Endotrichini